The NATO Missile Firing Installation or NAMFI ("Crete Firing Range") is an extensive missile firing range located at Souda Bay on the island of Crete, Greece.

History

NAMFI was established in 1967 as a NATO training facility for Air Defence Systems and it takes advantage of clear atmospheric conditions throughout the year. Currently NAMFI is regularly used by the armed forces of Greece, Germany, the Netherlands, and the United States. In the past it was also used by Belgium, Denmark and Norway.

Activities
Today the firing range is used mostly for MIM-104 Patriot and MIM-23 Hawk launches, although a wide range of surface to air and air to surface missiles are fired occasionally. As the trajectories of the missiles cross busy air and sea areas, an Air and Sea surveillance radar system is used to resolve possible conflicts.

References

External links
 NATO Missile Firing Installation (NAMFI)

Souda Bay
NATO installations in Greece
Military installations of Greece
Missile operation
1967 establishments in Greece
Buildings and structures in Chania (regional unit)